Emma Jane Tucker (born 24 October 1966) is an English journalist and editor in chief of The Wall Street Journal, where she is the first woman to lead the  publication. She was previously the editor of The Sunday Times,  and a deputy editor of The Times.

Early life and education
Tucker was born on 24 October 1966 in London, England, the daughter of Nicholas Tucker and Jacqueline Anthony. She attended Wallands School and Priory School in Lewes, East Sussex. She applied for entry into Atlantic College in Wales. She attended an interview in Mecklenburgh Square, London, where she was offered an opportunity to study at the Armand Hammer United World College of the American West (UWC-USA) in Montezuma, New Mexico, US. Six weeks later she won a scholarship to study at UWC-USA, and attended it from the age of 16 in 1983 until 1985. She later said "I was very homesick to begin with, but I had an incredible two years there. It was a complete change of pace, life, outlook, everything". She then read Philosophy, Politics and Economics at University College, Oxford.

Career
In 1990, Tucker became a graduate trainee at the Financial Times (FT). She worked in the House of Commons press gallery, and wrote the money markets column. She worked in the newspaper's economics room at the time of the ERM crisis. She later said, "they were slightly baffled [the FT]... because they hadn't got many young women".

Tucker was posted to Brussels from 1994 to 2000, where she covered the European Union in her first foreign correspondent job. In January 2000 she moved to Berlin and was a foreign correspondent in Germany for three years. She applied to become property editor of the FT, and moved to features. She became editor of FT Weekend.

Tucker joined The Times in 2007 as associate features editor and a year later became editor of Times2. In 2012 she became The Times editorial director. In October 2013 she was appointed deputy editor, under editor John Witherow, succeeding Keith Blackmore who had stood down that August.

At the end of January 2020, Tucker became the first female editor of The Sunday Times since Rachel Beer in 1901. During Tucker's tenure as editor, the newspaper reported on controversies regarding COVID-19 contracts.

In December 2022, she was named the new editor of The Wall Street Journal, "the first woman to lead the 133-year-old business publication," replacing Matt Murray on February 1, 2023.

Personal life
Tucker has three sons, including one born in February 2001. They lived in Lewes, East Sussex. Tucker divorced her first husband and moved to London. In 2008, she then married her second husband, Peter Andreas Howarth, who already had three sons.

She lives in the Herne Hill section of South London with her husband.

References

Living people
1966 births
Alumni of University College, Oxford
British journalists
Financial Times people
People educated at a United World College
People educated at Priory School, Lewes
The Sunday Times people
The Times people
The Wall Street Journal people